S. arabica may refer to:
 Siccia arabica, a moth species found in Saudi Arabia
 Sillago arabica, the shortnose whiting, an inshore marine fish species that inhabits only the Persian Gulf

See also
 Arabica (disambiguation)